James Brewer may refer to:

James Brewer (American football) (born 1987), American football offensive tackle
James Norris Brewer (1777–1839), English topographer and novelist
James Alexander Brewer (1818–1886), British naturalist, plant-collector and botanist
Jim Brewer (baseball) (1937–1987), American relief pitcher in Major League Baseball
Jim Brewer (basketball) (born 1951), American NBA player
Jim Brewer (blues musician) (1920–1988), American blues singer and guitarist

See also
Jim Breuer (born 1967), American comedian